The Smith & Wesson K-38 Combat Masterpiece, Revolver Model 15 is a six-shot double-action revolver, with adjustable open sights, built on the medium-size "K" frame. It is chambered for the .38 Special cartridge and is fitted with a  barrel, though additional barrel options have been offered at various times during its production.  Originally known as the "K-38 Combat Masterpiece", it was renamed the Model 15 in 1957 when all Smith & Wesson revolvers were given numerical model numbers.  It is a shorter barrel version of the Smith & Wesson Model 14 Target Masterpiece and essentially an adjustable-sight version of the seminal Smith & Wesson Model 10 ("Military and Police") revolver with target shooting features. The main production run of the Model 15 was from 1949 to 1999. It was discontinued for approximately a decade until 2011, when a re-tooled version was re-released under S&W's Classics Revolvers line.

History
The Smith & Wesson K-38 Combat Masterpiece Revolver Model 15 is a derivative of the classic 1899 K-frame (medium frame) Military and Police .38 S&W Special (aka .38 Special) six-shot double-action revolver.  The M&P underwent steady evolution throughout the 20th century and S&W spun off several variations as separate models in the post World War II years.  One of these was the K-38 Target Masterpiece, which began production in 1947.  The Target Masterpiece included a number of new and/or special features, including a six-inch barrel with a narrow rib to provide a level sight plane, a Patridge front sight, a micrometer click rear sight, S&W's .375” short-throw hammer, a trigger adjustment for overtravel, and improved grips. Noting the accuracy of the Target Masterpiece, a number of police departments and the FBI soon requested the same revolver with a four-inch barrel and a Baughman Quick Draw front sight.  The result was the K-38 Combat Masterpiece.  The major distinction between the K-38 Target Masterpiece and the K-38 Combat Masterpiece is the barrel length and the front sight.

In 1957, the K-38 Combat Masterpiece was renamed the Model 15 when all Smith & Wesson revolvers were given numerical model numbers.  (The Military & Police and the Target Masterpiece were renamed the Model 10 and Model 14 respectively.)  The model number is stamped on the frame behind the cylinder yoke, so it is visible (only) when the cylinder is open.  A number of production and engineering changes have been made throughout the years, some of which are noted by a dash number suffixed to the Model number (15-1, -2, -3).

Over the years, the Model 15 has been produced with several barrel lengths, with 4-inch (standard) and 2-inch (1964–1988) being the most common.  In 1972, S&W released a stainless steel version as the Model 67. In 1997 the hammer and internal lockworks were modified from an on-the-hammer firing pin / internal hammer block to a floating firing pin / MIM flat hammer, and kept the hammer block that, unlike a transfer bar safety design, moves up with the trigger pull. The hammer hits a transfer bar, transferring the strike to the firing pin, while the block in a hammer block system moves down with the trigger pull, unblocking the hammer from the firing pin, allowing the hammer to strike the firing pin. These two safety systems work oppositely, but achieve the same goal of only allowing the gun to fire when the trigger is pulled all the way.

The Model 15 was a popular sidearm for law enforcement and was the standard-issue sidearm of the U.S. Air Force Police from 1962 until 1992 when it was replaced by the Beretta M9 pistol.

Production of the Model 15 was discontinued in 1999 when Smith & Wesson was purchased and reorganized, although a couple limited run "Heritage Series" models were released in 2001 and 2002.  In 2011 Smith & Wesson re-introduced the Model 15 (15-10) under their Classics Revolvers line, newly machined, with a shrouded redesigned barrel, and a built-in trigger lock (located just above the cylinder release thumbpiece on the left side).

Specifications
 Caliber:  .38 S&W Special
 Capacity:  6
 Barrel:  4” (standard configuration)
 Length overall:  9 1/8” With 4” barrel
 Weight loaded:  34 oz. With 4” barrel
 Sights:  Front – 1/8” Baughman Quick Draw on plain ramp.  Rear: S&W Micrometer Click Sight, adjustable for windage and elevation.
 Frame:  square butt with grooved tangs
 Stocks:  checked walnut service with S&W monograms
 Finish:  S&W (CHROME) with sandblasting and serrations around sighting area to break up light reflections
 Trigger:  S&W grooving with adjustable trigger stop
 Ammunition:  .38 S&W Special, .38 S&W Special +P

Engineering and production changes timeline

As the K-38 Combat Masterpiece Revolver Model 15 evolved the following engineering and production changes were made:
 1949, K-38 Combat Masterpiece introduced
 1955, Delete upper sideplate screw
 15,   1957 K-38 Combat Masterpiece continued as the Model 15; stamping of model number
 15–1, 1959 Change extractor rod, right hand to left hand thread
 15–2, 1961 Delete trigger guard screw, change cylinder stop
 15–2, 1964 Introduce 2” heavy barrel
 15–3, 1967 Relocation of rear sight leaf screw
 15–3, 1968 Delete diamond grips
 15–4, 1977 Change to put gas ring from yoke to cylinder; pinned barrel eliminated
 15–5, 1982
 15–5, 1986 Introduction of 6” and 8-3/8” barrel
 15–6, 1988 New yoke retention system/ radius stud package/hammer nose bushing
 15–6, 1988 Discontinue 8-3/8” and 2” barrel
 15–6, 1992 Discontinue 6” barrel, blue finish only
 15–7, 1994 Synthetic grips introduced, drill and tap frame, change rear seat leaf, change extractor
 15–7, 1995 Delete square butt
 15–7, 1996 Begin shipments in blue plastic case
 15–7, 1997 4” barrel only; change to MIM thumbpiece; shipped with master trigger locks; change to MIM trigger
 15–8, 1997 Changes in frame design: cylinder stop stud eliminated; eliminate serrated tangs; change to MIM hammer with floating firing pin and change internal lockworks
 15–8, 1999 Model 15 discontinued in November
 15–8, 2001 Limited run Lew Horton Heritage Series from the S&W Performance Center.
 15–9, 2002 Limited run Lew Horton Heritage Series McGivern Models from the S&W Performance Center.  3 Models commemorating Ed McGivern's world speed records in 1934 with a revolver.  All models have a Patridge front sight with Gold Bead, round butt frame with Altamount Fancy checkered service grips of that era, 6” barrel, Ed McGivern commemorative plate mounted on right side of frame, Heritage Series box.
 15–10, 2011 Reintroduced in Classics Revolvers line, re-tooled, shrouded redesigned barrel, internal trigger lock. Discontinued in 2013.

Military and police usage
As the "K-38 Combat Masterpiece", this revolver was first purchased in 1956 for the Strategic Air Command Elite Guard of the United States Air Force. From 1960 to 1969 the Air Force bought large numbers of Model 15–1, 15–2, and 15-3 revolvers with a 4" barrel. The only distinctive markings are "U.S.A.F" on the left side of the frame. Originally all were blued, though some were reparkerized while in Air Force service. The Model 15 was the standard issue sidearm of the U.S. Air Force Air/Security Police from 1962 to 1992. It was issued to security personnel in other branches of the U.S. armed forces, including the Naval Security Forces.

The Air Force issued two types of .38 Special duty ammunition for the Model 15, originally the M41 .38 Special Ball (full metal jacket) cartridge, or the later-developed Caliber .38 Special, Ball, PGU-12/B High Velocity cartridge. The M41 was a low pressure cartridge rated at 13,000 psi (90 MPa), originally designed for 158 grain (10.2g) ball ammunition, but loaded with a 130 grain (8.4g) FMJ bullet.

The S&W Model 15 revolvers were replaced by the Beretta M9 pistol in 9×19mm caliber beginning in 1985, with complete turnover by the early 1990s.

In addition to military use, the Model 15 was issued by many police departments across the United States as well as various federal law enforcement agencies. In 1972 S&W produced a stainless steel version of the Model 15 which it termed the Model 67.

Users
The LAPD's Model 15 revolvers (and department issued Model 36 5-shot, 2-inch barrelled snub nose Smith & Wesson revolvers for detectives, plainclothes, undercover and other officers' off duty carry) were modified to be fired double-action only. This was accomplished by the department armorer who ground the full cock notch from the hammers. Officers were then trained to shoot combat style without ever cocking the weapons. This change was likely the result of unintended injuries and/or property damage, and of litigation against the LAPD after officers had cocked their weapons only to have them discharge inadvertently, possibly as a result of physical attacks or having been startled in the course of searching for suspects. In lawsuits, the principle of res ipsa loquitur was easily affirmed because "an inadvertent weapon discharge is a negligent discharge".

Overland Park Police Department (Kansas) used the revolver before going to semi-automatic Beretta 92 pistols.

The Florida Department of Corrections used the Model 15 until it was replaced by the Smith & Wesson M&P.

See also
 The Model 10 Military & Police (cornerstone of the S&W .38 Special line of revolvers)
 The Model 14 Target Masterpiece (6" barrel predecessor to the Model 15)
 The Model 18 Combat Masterpiece (.22 caliber version of the Model 15)
 The Model 19 Combat Magnum (.357 magnum version of the model 15)
 The Model 67, the stainless steel version of the Model 15

References

External links

Smith & Wesson Model 15 Classic Product Page 
Smith & Wesson "Military and Police" M10 and other K-frame revolvers
S&W Model 15 Safety System (video)
S&W Model 10 Part 1 - Disassembly (video)(same process and general parts as Model 15) 
S&W Model 10 Part 2  - Reassembly (video)(same process and general parts as Model 15) 

.38 Special firearms
Military revolvers
Police weapons
Revolvers of the United States
Smith & Wesson revolvers